The 2015 Ontario Tankard, the Southern Ontario men's provincial curling championship, was held from February 2 to 8 at the Dorchester Flight Exec Centre in Dorchester, Ontario. The winning Mark Kean rink represented Ontario at the 2015 Tim Hortons Brier in Calgary, Alberta.

Teams

Round-robin standings
Final round-robin standings

Results

Draw 1
Monday, February 2, 2:00 pm

Draw 2
Monday, February 2, 7:30pm

Draw 3
Tuesday, February 3, 2:00 pm

Draw 4
Tuesday February 3, 7:00 pm

Draw 5
Wednesday, February 4, 9:00 am

Draw 6
Wednesday, February 4, 2:00 pm

Draw 7
Wednesday, February 4, 7:00 pm

Draw 8
Thursday, February 5, 2:00 pm

Draw 9
Thursday, February 5, 7:00 pm

Draw 10
Friday, February 6, 2:00 pm

Draw 11
Friday, February 6, 7:00 pm

Tiebreakers
Saturday, February 7, 9:00 am

Playoffs

1 vs. 2
Saturday, February 7, 2:00 pm

3 vs. 4
Saturday, February 7, 2:00 pm

Semifinal
Sunday, February 8, 8:30 am

Final
Sunday, February 8, 12:30 pm

Qualification
Southern Ontario zones will run from December 6–21, 2014 with regional tournaments scheduled for January 3–11. Two teams from each zone qualify to 4 regional tournaments, and two teams from each of the two tournaments qualify to provincials. Two additional teams qualify out of a second chance qualifier.  As defending champions, the Greg Balsdon rink from the Glendale Golf and Country Club get an automatic berth in the Tankard.

Regional Qualifiers In Bold

Zone Qualification

Zone 1
December 12–14, at the RCMP Curling Club, Ottawa

Teams entered:

Chris Gardner (Ottawa)
Ian MacAulay (RCMP)
Mark Homan (Ottawa)
Doug Johnston (Ottawa)
Gary Rowe (Ottawa)
Rob Fraser (Ottawa)

Bracket:

Zone 2
December 12–14, at the RCMP Curling Club, Ottawa

Teams entered:

Brian Lewis (Manotick)
Howard Rajala (Rideau)
J. P. Lachance (Rideau)
Steve Lodge (Brockville)
Andrew Bugg (Rideau)
Bill Duck (Ottawa Hunt)

Bracket:

Zone 3
December 12–14, at the RCMP Curling Club, Ottawa

Teams entered:

Colin Dow (Huntley)
Doug Brewer (Dalhousie Lake)
Josh Adams (Granite of Ottawa West)
Stephen Watson (Renfrew)
Dennis Elgie (City View)

Brackets:

Zone 4
December 20, at the Napanee & District Curling Club, Napanee

Teams entered:
Don Bowser (Cataraqui)
Dave Collyer (Quinte)
Bryce Rowe (Napanee)
Dennis Murray (Quinte)

Brackets:

Zone 5
December 20–21, at the Peterborough Curling Club, Peterborough

Teams entered:

Mark Kean (Fenelon Falls)
Shannon Beddows (Lindsay)
Nick Rizzo (Peterborough)
Jason Whitehill (Peterborough)
Terry Arnold (Haliburton)
Glenn Garneys (Peterborough)

Bracket:

Zone 6
December 6–7, at the Unionville Curling Club, Unionville

Teams entered:

John Epping (Annandale)
Nathan Martin (Oshawa)
Richard Krell (Annandale)
Jason March (Annandale)
Jim Bell (Unionville)
Dave Fischer (Oshawa Golf)
John Bell (Unionville)
Rob Houston (Uxbridge)
Kyle Mogavero (Oshawa)

Brackets:

Zone 7
December 13–14, at the York Curling Club, Newmarket

Teams entered:

Rob Lobel (Thornhill)
Michael Shepherd (Richmond Hill)
Roy Arndt (Toronto Cricket)
Brent Gray (Bayview)
Dave Coutanche (Richmond Hill)
Bryan Johnson (York)

Bracket:

Zone 8
December 13–14, at the Dixie Curling Club, Mississauga

Teams entered:

Peter Corner (St. George's)
Rob Retchless (Royal Canadian)
Josh Johnston (Royal Canadian)
Dennis Moretto (Dixie)
Patrick Morris (High Park)
Craig Shinde (Dixie)
Travis Belchior (Oakville)

Bracket:

Zone 9
December 19–21, at The Club at North Halton, Georgetown

Teams entered:
Jake Walker (Brampton)
Mike Harris (North Halton)
Ryan Myler (Brampton)
Todd Dakers (Chinguacousy)
Alex Foster (North Halton) 
Denis Cordick (North Halton)

Bracket:

Zone 10
December 19–21, at the Midland Curling Club, Midland

Teams entered:

Glenn Howard (Penetanguishene)
Darryl Prebble (Cookstown)
Andrew Thompson (Stroud)
Chris Wimmer (Cookstown)
Daryl Shane (Stroud)
Bryan Wilson (Midland)
Keith Press (Penetanguishene)

Bracket:

Zone 11
December 13, at the Meaford Curling Club, Meaford

Teams entered:

Cory Heggestad (Markdale)
Ian Dickie (Collingwood)
Scott Ballantyne (Tara)
Trevor Coburn (Markdale)

Brackets:

Zone 12
December 13, at the Galt Country Club, Cambridge

Teams entered:

Robert Rumfeldt (Guelph)
Aaron Squires (Kitchener-Waterloo Granite)
Bruce McConnell (Kitchener-Waterloo Granite)
Damien Villard (Galt Country)

Brackets:

Zone 13
December 6–7, at the Glendale Golf & Country Club, Hamilton

Teams entered:

Pat Ferris (Grimsby)
Ian Robertson (Dundas Granite)
Bill Buchanan (Welland)
Mark Fletcher (Burlington)
Simon Ouellet (Glendale)
Jason Stahl (Dundas Granite)

Brackets:

Zone 14
December 13, at the Listowel Curling Club, Listowel

Teams entered:

Brent Ross (Harriston)
Jon St. Denis (Listowel)
Doug Gibson (Palmerston)
Mike Schumacher (Walkerton)

Brackets:

Zone 15
December 13–14, at the Brantford Golf & Country Club, Brantford

Teams entered:

Joe Frans (St. Thomas)
Wayne Tuck, Jr. (Brant)
Terry Corbin (Brant)
Bob Armstrong (Ingersoll)
Jason Malcho (Stratford)

Bracket:

Zone 16
December 13–14, at the Chatham Granite Club, Chatham

Teams entered:

Scott McDonald (Highland)
Dale Kelly (Chatham Granite)
John Young (Chatham Granite)
Tom Pruliere (Ilderton)
Chris Liscumb (Ilderton)
Kirk Massey (London)
Mike Drake (Kingsville)

Bracket:

Regional qualification

Region 1
January 10–11 , Russell Curling Club, Russell

Region 2
January 10–11 , Whitby Curling Club, Whitby

Region 3
January 3–4 , Gravenhurst Curling Club, Gravenhurst

Region 4
January 3–4 , Wingham Golf & Curling Club, Wingham

Challenge Round
January 16–19, at the Bradford & District Curling Club, Bradford

References

External links
Official site

Ontario Tankard
Ontario Tankard
Middlesex County, Ontario
Ontario Tankard